The fifth series of I'm a Celebrity...Get Me Out of Here! began on 20 November 2005 and ended on 5 December 2005. The programme ran for 16 days (18 days if counting the day the celebrities arrived and the morning the finalists exited). The series was won by Carol Thatcher.

Contestants
12 contestants participated, one more than in the previous series.

Results and elimination

 Indicates that the celebrity received the fewest votes and was immediately eliminated (no bottom two)
 Indicates that the celebrity was in the bottom two in the public vote

Bushtucker Trials
The contestants take part in daily trials to earn food. The participants are chosen by the public, up until the first eviction, when the campers decide who will take part in the trial

 The public voted for who they wanted to face the trial
 The contestants decided who did which trial
 The trial was compulsory and neither the public or celebrities decided who took part

Star count

References

2005 British television seasons
05